Eupithecia shikokuensis is a moth in the family Geometridae. It is found in Japan.

References

Moths described in 1980
shikokuensis
Moths of Japan